Solène Marie Reine Durand (born 20 November 1994) is a French professional footballer who plays as a goalkeeper for Division 1 Féminine club Guingamp and the France national team.

Club career
Durand began her professional career at Montpellier HSC in 2009. She had previously played for Varennes-le-Grand (2000 to 2006) in Saône-et-Loire, before leaving for Chatenoy-le-Royal, where she played from 2006 to 2009.

In 2017, Durand joined Guingamp as the team's starting goalkeeper.

International career
In 2019, Durand was called up to the French national team, for the 2019 FIFA Women's World Cup.

Career statistics

International

References

External links

 
 
 
 Player profile at 2019 FIFA Women's World Cup
 MHSC player profile

1994 births
Living people
French women's footballers
France women's youth international footballers
Women's association football goalkeepers
Division 1 Féminine players
Montpellier HSC (women) players
En Avant Guingamp (women) players
2019 FIFA Women's World Cup players
People from Saint-Rémy, Saône-et-Loire
Sportspeople from Saône-et-Loire
Footballers from Bourgogne-Franche-Comté
21st-century French women